The 2016 Pro Kabaddi League season was the fourth season of Pro Kabaddi League, that ran from 25 June to 31 July 2016.

Teams

Stadium and locations

Personnel

Points table

League stage

Leg 1: Shree Shiv Chhatrapati Sports Complex, Pune

Leg 2: Sawai Mansingh Stadium, Jaipur

Leg 3: Gachibowli Indoor Stadium, Hyderabad

Leg 4: Patliputra Sports Complex, Patna

Leg 5: Sree Kanteerava Stadium, Bengaluru

Leg 6: Netaji Indoor Stadium, Kolkata

Leg 7: Sardar Vallabhbhai Patel Indoor Stadium, Mumbai

Leg 8: Thyagaraj Sports Complex, Delhi

Playoff Stage

Semi-final
1st Semi final

2nd semi final

Third Place

Final

Statistics

Top 10 Raiders

Top 10 Defenders

References

Pro Kabaddi League seasons
2016 in Indian sport